Mondy is a name and a surname. Notable people with the name include:
 Bill Mondy, American film and television actor
 Duke Mondy (born 1990), American basketball player
 Nell I. Mondy (1921–2005), American biochemist
 Pierre Mondy (1925–2012), French film and theatre actor and director
 Robert W. Mondy (1908–1997), American historian

See also
Mondy, Republic of Buryatia